Ulmus 'Karagatch' is a hybrid cultivar from Turkestan (from a region now part of Turkmenistan), selected in the early 20th century and considered either a backcrossing of U. × androssowii and U. pumila, or simply a cultivar of × androssowii. It was grown from seeds, introduced from Bairam Ali in Russian Turkestan by Arthur P. Davis in the 1930s, as U. 'Karagatch', under which name it was planted at Kew.

Description
The Kew specimen had the appearance of a northern European field elm, more tall than broad. 'Karagatch' was described by the US Department of Agriculture (1917) as a "rapid-growing elm", suitable for semi-arid regions, with harder wood than that of American Elm.

Pests and diseases
No information available.

Cultivation
'Karagatch' was present at Kew and in The Hague from the early 1930s. The Kew specimen was felled in 2015 as 'unsafe'. It was cloned and remains in cultivation (see 'Accessions').

Etymology
The name 'karagatch' (:'black tree' in the Turkic languages, widely used for 'elm') has historically also been applied to U. minor 'Umbraculifera' (syn. U. densa) from the same region , and more loosely to field elm found in Turkey and to U. pumila found in Mongolia.

Accessions

North America
Morton Arboretum, US. As Ulmus × androssowii × U. pumila hybrid. Acc. no. 353-72

Europe
Grange Farm Arboretum, Lincolnshire, UK. Acc. details not known.
Wijdemeren City Council, Netherlands. Elm collection, ‘s-Gravelandsevaartweg, Loosdrecht, five trees planted 2016

References

External links
  Juvenile long shoot (?); sheet described as 'Karagatch elm'; Den Haag specimen via Kew Gardens, 1931

Hybrid elm cultivar
Ulmus articles with images
Ulmus